Harold & Kumar is the name of a series of American films created by Jon Hurwitz and Hayden Schlossberg. Beginning with Harold & Kumar Go to White Castle (2004), and followed by Harold & Kumar Escape from Guantanamo Bay (2008) and A Very Harold & Kumar Christmas (2011), the films star John Cho, Kal Penn, and Neil Patrick Harris.

The first film was directed by Danny Leiner, the second was directed by creators Hurwitz and Schlossberg, and the third by Todd Strauss-Schulson. The films were distributed by New Line Cinema and Warner Bros.; the films were produced by  Mandate Pictures, Kingsgate Films, Endgame Entertainment, and New Line Cinema. The films chronicle the adventures of Harold Lee (Cho) and Kumar Patel (Penn).

The films are considered buddy stoner comedies, with surreal and animated elements in later sequels. Contrasting ideas and perspectives on life, romance, and maturity feature as recurring themes, while the series is notable for its racially diverse cast, one of the first for a mainstream Hollywood comedy film series.

Harold & Kumar has received generally mixed to positive critical reception and is a commercial success, grossing over $102 million worldwide against a combined budget of $40 million.

Films

Harold & Kumar Go to White Castle (2004)

Harold Lee and Kumar Patel are two Asian-American (Korean and Indian) stoners who get the munchies and embark on a quest throughout New Jersey for White Castle burgers after seeing them advertised on TV. On their journey, they encounter many obstacles, including a gang of extreme sports punks, a raccoon with an attitude, a group of East Asian nerds, a racist police department, a cheetah that has escaped from a zoo, and an out-of-control Neil Patrick Harris.

Harold & Kumar Escape from Guantanamo Bay (2008)

Immediately following the events of Harold & Kumar Go to White Castle, Harold Lee and Kumar Patel fly to Amsterdam so Harold can pursue a budding romance with his vacationing neighbor. The pair run into Vanessa, Kumar's ex-girlfriend, and her fiancé Colton, another old college buddy who helped Harold with getting a job at Brewster-Keagan, at the airport. During the plane flight, an elderly woman sees Kumar lighting a hand-crafted smokeless bong, thinks that it is a bomb, and screams "Terrorist!". After a confusion of the words "bong" and "bomb", two undercover air marshals tackle Kumar, who accidentally drops the bong on the floor, breaking it and releasing what another passenger thinks is "Poison gas!". Harold and Kumar are detained by Ron Fox, a racist Deputy Secretary of Homeland Security, in Washington, D.C., who then sends them to the Guantanamo Bay detention camp. But just as they are about to get sexually assaulted with a  "cockmeat sandwich", the neighboring prisoners assault the guards and they are able to escape back to the United States with the help of Cuban boat people they encounter. They meet with their college friend, Raza, who arranges a car for them to travel to Texas in search of Colton, a member of a family who has connections with political officials. On the way to Texas, they encounter various people from an inbred trailer home family to the Ku Klux Klan to Neil Patrick Harris and George W. Bush.

A Very Harold & Kumar Christmas (2011)

In April 2009, Kal Penn accepted the position of Associate Director of the White House Office of Public Liaison in the Obama administration; when asked if his new job would mean no more Harold and Kumar films, he said, "That's probably true for now."

A new film entitled A Very Harold & Kumar Christmas was announced on May 7, 2009. Jon Hurwitz and Hayden Schlossberg returned to write the film while Todd Strauss-Schulson directed. Greg Shapiro returned as producer with Kal Penn and John Cho reprising their title roles. Penn left his job with the White House on June 1, 2010, to reprise his role as Kumar in the third Harold & Kumar installment. After filming was completed, Penn returned to the White House.

A Very Harold & Kumar Christmas was released on November 4, 2011, and was the first film in the series to be shown in 3D. Seven years after the events of Harold & Kumar Go to White Castle and Harold & Kumar Escape from Guantanamo Bay, Harold and Kumar reconnect and embark on an adventure to find a new Christmas tree after Harold destroys the original while trying to dispose of Kumar's joint.

Future
In July 2016, co-star John Cho revealed that he had pitched an idea for a fourth Harold & Kumar and thought there was a chance it might get made.  In an interview with Den of Geek!, Cho stated, "I thought of a really great idea, and I pitched it out to the director when we happened to be having dinner one night. And I don't know...I think we're gonna get this made.” 

In 2014, it was announced that Adult Swim picked up Harold and Kumar: The Animated Series, and this was confirmed by Kal Penn, David Krumholtz, and Jon Hurwitz. However, it was never produced.

On November 12, 2021, while doing an Instagram Q&A for his new book,
Kal Penn was asked whether a 4th film was happening. His response was, "I believe so."

Characters

Harold Lee

Harold Lee is a Korean American investment banker who resides in New Jersey. The character was created by Jon Hurwitz and Hayden Schlossberg and is based upon their real-life friend, named Harold Lee.  The character is portrayed by John Cho in all three films.

In Harold & Kumar Go to White Castle, Harold is a hard-working white-collar worker from northern New Jersey. His lazy but intelligent best friend and roommate is Kumar Patel. At times, Harold lets go of his obligations, but only during moments of extreme coercion, to the point where he amazes his laid-back friend Kumar. Harold is the yin to Kumar's yang, with the both of them being united through their enjoyment of cannabis smoking after a long day's work and or leisurely fun (such as aboard an airplane in the sequel, and an after work "Friday night special" in the first film).

Harold's romantic life centers around John Hughes-like fancies (as is evidenced by his obsession with film classics such as Sixteen Candles). Harold thinks that he'll wind up with a similarly repressed Korean-American young woman—Cindy Kim—who isn't as repressed as he thinks. The true object of Harold's desire, however, is Maria Perez (played by Paula Garcés), who lives down the hall from him in his building.

In Harold & Kumar Escape from Guantanamo Bay, when embarking on their trip to Amsterdam they are arrested on the flight there after Kumar tests out his "smokeless bong" in the airplane lavatory. Then the two are sent to Guantanamo Bay where they are involved in a series of comedic events. In one of Kumar's flashbacks, it is revealed that Harold used to be an emo and Kumar was a hard working mathematically proficient nerd in college.

In A Very Harold & Kumar Christmas, Harold is married to Maria and hasn't spoken to Kumar in years. The two are reunited and rekindle their friendship after Kumar brings over a package for Harold that arrived at their old apartment. Inside the package is a marijuana joint, which winds up burning down Harold's father in law's Christmas tree; after an eventful night of looking for a replacement tree, it is revealed that the package was a gift from Santa Claus, who wanted the two to become friends again.

Kumar Patel

Kumar Patel is an Indian American premed student residing in New Jersey. His family includes his father and his brother, Saikat Patel. The character was created by Jon Hurwitz and Hayden Schlossberg, and is portrayed by Kal Penn in all three films.

In Harold & Kumar Go to White Castle, Kumar Patel is a 22-year-old college graduate. He shares an apartment with his best friend, Harold Lee. Unlike Harold, Kumar is a fearless, confident slacker who is capable of doing what he wants. Both his father and brother are successful doctors and expect him to follow in their footsteps. Despite his intelligence, including having the ability to perform complex surgeries such as neurosurgery as shown when trying to search for Medical marijuana at the hospital his father and brother work at, he is not interested in going to medical school and prefers to smoke marijuana during the night.

In Harold & Kumar Escape from Guantanamo Bay, it is revealed that he had a girlfriend Vanessa in college, who introduced him to marijuana and transformed him from an aloof geek into the easy-going stoner he is today. She is about to marry the shifty, arrogant frat boy Colton Graham (who disapproves of her marijuana habit), but Kumar interrupts the wedding and wins her back by reciting "Square Root of 3," a math themed love poem that he was afraid to show her in college. Harold, Kumar and Vanessa then go to Amsterdam to find Maria, Harold's love interest.

In A Very Harold & Kumar Christmas, Kumar hasn't spoken to Harold in years. The two are reunited and rekindle their friendship after Kumar brings over a package for Harold that arrived at their old apartment. Inside the package is a marijuana joint, which winds up burning down Harold's Christmas tree; after an eventful night of looking for a replacement tree, it is revealed that the package was a gift from Santa Claus, who wanted the two to become friends again.
Vanessa tells Kumar she is pregnant shortly after their breakup, but believes that Kumar is not mature enough to raise their child. After his adventure, Kumar tells Vanessa he has matured and very much wants to raise the baby with her, even offering to return to medical school and give up marijuana. Vanessa decides to give him another chance, also telling him he shouldn't give up his favorite recreational activity.

Neil Patrick Harris

All three films feature Neil Patrick Harris playing a fictionalized version of himself. In the films, Harris is portrayed as a heavy drug user and womanizer, despite being openly gay in real life. Harris didn't publicly come out until 2006, two years after White Castle was released. Although Guantanamo Bay was released two years after Harris came out, his fictional self was still characterized as a womanizer until the third film, when it's revealed that Harris is only pretending to be gay just to have sex with women. His real-life partner, David Burtka, appears as a fictionalized version of himself, who is Harris' drug dealer posing as the latter's life partner.

In a 2008 interview with Ain't It Cool News, Neil Patrick Harris revealed that the series' writers were discussing the possibility of a spin-off movie based on his fictional persona.

Rosenberg and Goldstein
Andy Rosenberg and Seth Goldstein are two Jewish friends and neighbors of Harold and Kumar portrayed by Eddie Kaye Thomas and David Krumholtz. They declined to go to White Castle with Harold and Kumar as they chose Hot Dog Heaven instead as well as wanted to see Katie Holmes topless in the film The Gift, but in the third movie did go to White Castle. 

In the second movie, they are interrogated by the U.S. government when Harold and Kumar are on the run as mistaken terrorists. 

In the third movie, Goldstein has a son named Christian and stated he had converted to Christianity after marrying his wife, and even wished to uncircumcise himself, which all aggravated Rosenberg who still practices Judaism. The duo are a homage of Shakespearean characters Rosencrantz and Guildenstern.

Maria Perez-Lee
Maria is a tenant of Harold and Kumar's apartment played by Paula Garcés in all three films. In the first film, Harold & Kumar Go to White Castle, Harold has a crush on Maria but is unable to muster up the courage to talk to her. However, after finally getting White Castle, he finally tells her how he feels and she reciprocates his feelings and they make out in their apartment's elevator. Maria then tells Harold she's going to the weed capital Amsterdam for ten days and she leaves. After sharing this information with Kumar, they decide at the end of the first film to go to Amsterdam and find her.

At the end of the second film, Harold & Kumar Escape from Guantanamo Bay, Harold reunites with her in Amsterdam to declare his love to her for which she declares her love back to him.

In the third film, A Very Harold & Kumar Christmas, Maria and Harold have been married for years, own their own nice house, and have been struggling to get pregnant. Maria's father (Danny Trejo) visiting her and Harold with the rest of her family for Christmas, does not like Harold, but by the end if the film he accepts Harold. Maria also happily reveals to Harold that she is pregnant and they are about to start a family.

Vanessa Fanning
Vanessa, portrayed by Danneel Ackles (then credited as Danneel Harris), is introduced in the second film, Harold & Kumar Escape from Guantanamo Bay as Kumar's ex-girlfriend from two years prior. Her wedding is in a week as she is now engaged to Colten, an arrogant, snobby man who comes from a very wealthy family. Throughout the film it is shown that Vanessa is unhappy in her relationship with Colten and actually loves Kumar. Also, through a flashback, it is shown that Vanessa introduced Kumar to marijuana in college. After Colten betrays them, Harold and Kumar crash Vanessa's wedding so Kumar can tell her how Colten betrayed them and profess his love to her. After Colten attacks Harold but is knocked down, Vanessa tells Kumar how embarrassed she is they ruined her wedding. Kumar, trying to doing something even more embarrassing, recites a poem he wrote in college that he was always too ashamed to show her. She smiles and they leave the wedding together a couple, flying out to Amsterdam to help Harold find Maria.

In the third film, A Very Harold & Kumar Christmas, it is revealed Vanessa left Kumar three months ago due to his immaturity and childishness. Later, she reveals she's pregnant with Kumar's child. After Kumar reacts childishly, she decides to cut him out of her life. However, at the end of the movie, Kumar tells Vanessa that he's finally ready to grow up and is ready to be an adult and they get back together, ready to start a family of their own.

Reception

Box office performance

Home media

Critical reception

References

External links

 
 
 
 

American comedy duos
Fictional Asian-American people
Fictional cannabis users
Fictional characters from New Jersey
Fictional film duos
Fictional Indian-American people
Fictional Korean people
Film characters introduced in 2004
New Line Cinema franchises
Trilogies